Shōryū-ji (青龍寺 kana: しょうりゅうじ） is a Shingon Buddhist Temple located in Tosa, Kōchi, Japan. It is the 36th temple of the Shikoku Pilgrimage.

The Honzon of worship at Shōryū-ji is Acala.

History 
According to the temple records, the temple was founded by Kukai during the Kōnin era (810-824). Following his travels to China, upon returning to Japan with the knowledge that Kukai's teacher Huiguo had bestowed upon him, Kukai grasped his vajra, prayed that he had arrived in a land he was destined to, and threw it eastwards.

Kukai sensed that the vajra he had thrown was inside a pine tree of the mountain Shōryū-ji is located on, and reported to Emperor Saga. During the 6th year of the Kounin era (815), remembering his master's teachings, Kukai founded the construction of Shoryu-ji, which shared the same name as his masters temple in Chang-an, Qinglong Temple (青龍寺). The Honzon Acala was chosen due to an experience Kukai had during a storm while returning to Japan, in which Acala was said to have appeared and cut the waves with a sword, saving them, which Kukai had carved as the Honzon.

The temple was in ruins by the beginning of the Edo period (1603-1868), but the second feudal lord of the Tosa domain, Yamauchi Tadayoshi, had it restored during the Shōhō era (1644-1648). However, due to an earthquake and tsunami in 1707, it was rebuilt near the end of the Edo period.

References 

Buddhist temples in Japan
Tosa, Kōchi
Shikoku region